Eugene Park (born September 14, 1975) is a Korean-American electric violinist.

Biography
Eugene Park was born in New York, to Korean parents who were both doctors. Park began to play the violin at age three, entered the Juilliard Pre-College at age eight, and appeared at the Lincoln Center at age 13. After his graduation from Juilliard in 1996, he released two albums with Sony Music named 'The Bridge' (1997), and 'Peace' (1998).

He won awards at the Juilliard Competition, the Aspen Music School Competition, and the ISO Competition.

Among the orchestras Park has performed with are the Wayne Symphony Orchestra (at age 10),  the New York Philharmonic (at Kyunghee University in 2004), and the Seoul Symphony Orchestra.

In 2004, he toured ten US cities, including at the Lincoln Center and UCLA.

Park performed alongside Michael Jackson on the "Michael Jackson & Friends" benefit concert in Korea (1999), and at the Korean presidential inauguration for President Kim Dae Jung.

Park played the violin for Leon Lai's song "Sugar in the Marmalade", and is mentioned briefly in the lyrics.

Discography
1997: The Bridge
1998: Peace
2000: Live
2006: The 3rd - Gust
2011: mini album Nostalgia

References

Rock violinists
American musicians of Korean descent
Juilliard School alumni
1975 births
Living people
21st-century violinists